The Macanal Formation or Macanal Shale (Kilm, K1m) is a fossiliferous geological formation of the Altiplano Cundiboyacense and Tenza Valley in the Eastern Ranges of the Colombian Andes. The Macanal Formation contains numerous levels of fossiliferous abundances. Bivalves, ammonites and fossil flora have been found in the formation.

The formation is a source rock for oil and gas in the Eastern Cordillera Basin and adjacent Llanos Basin foothills and provides emeralds in the vicinity of Macanal, after which the formation is named.

Etymology 
The formation was defined and named in 1979 by Rodríguez and Ulloa after Macanal, Cundinamarca. The name Macanal is either derived from the Muysccubun word Macana, meaning garrote, or from the Macana palm tree.

Description

Lithologies 

The Macanal Formation contains high values of TOC. In the Eastern Cordillera Basin and the adjacent foothills of the Llanos Basin, the Macanal Formation is a source rock for oil and gas. In the vicinity of Macanal, the formation provides emeralds.

Stratigraphy and depositional environment 
The Macanal Formation, a unit of the Cáqueza Group, concordantly overlies the Guavio, Santa Rosa, Ubalá, Chivor and Batá Formations, and is concordantly overlain by the Las Juntas Formation. The age has been estimated to be Berriasian to Valanginian. Stratigraphically, the formation is time equivalent with the Mercedes, Tambor, Rosablanca, Murca and La Naveta Formations. The formation has been deposited in a shallow marine environment in an enclosed basin, with as provenance areas the Santander High and the Guiana Shield. The Macanal Formation is part of the syn-rift sequence of eastern Colombia.

Fossil content 
The Macanal Formation contains numerous levels of fossiliferous abundances. Bivalves, ammonites and flora have been found in the formation. Ammonites of Substeueroceras cf. mutabile, Sarasinella cf. hondana, Subalpinites sp., Berriasela sp., Neocomites cf. wichmanni, Olcostephanus sp., Olcostephanus cf. atherstoni, Favrella cf. colombiana, Acanthodiscus sp. have been registered in the formation, as well as bivalves of Corbis (Sphaera) cf. corrugata, Trigonia cf. hondana, Trigonia (Buchotrigonia) cf. abrupta, Trigonia (Notoscabrotrigonia) cf. tocaimaana, and Exogyra cf. boussingaulti. Analysis of the deformation registered in ammonite fossils has helped in understanding the tectonic history of the Llanos foothills of the Eastern Ranges.

Outcrops 

The Macanal Formation is apart from its type locality in the Batá River canyon, found in the Cravo Sur anticline, east of the Ocetá Páramo, in the Desespero Synclinal in the southern and northern parts of Labranzagrande, around Páez and Campohermoso, in the eastern part of Gama, bordering the Guavio Reservoir, and in the Servitá Synclinal, west of Villavicencio. The Macanal Formation crops out along the road between Bogotá and Villavicencio and is there heavily fractured and folded. The Macanal Formation is the most extensive formation around Cáqueza, and Gachalá, Cundinamarca.

The Pajarito Fault thrusts the Macanal Formation on top of the Fómeque Formation to the east of Lake Tota, and the Chámeza Fault thrusts the Macanal Formation on top of the overlying Las Juntas Formation around Chámeza, Casanare. The Ubaque Fault forms the contact between the Fómeque Formation and the Macanal Formation, while the Las Mercedes Fault puts the Quetame Group in contact with the Macanal Formation near Quetame, as does the San Juanito Fault. The Servitá Fault forms the contact between the Guatiquía Redbeds and the Macanal Formation, and the Upín Fault, part of the same system puts the Macanal Formation in contact with the Tertiary Palmichal Group. At this contact, brines are extracted from the formation.

Regional correlations

See also 

 Geology of the Eastern Hills
 Geology of the Ocetá Páramo
 Geology of the Altiplano Cundiboyacense

Notes and references

Notes

References

Bibliography

Maps

External links 

 

Geologic formations of Colombia
Cretaceous Colombia
Lower Cretaceous Series of South America
Berriasian Stage
Valanginian Stage
Shale formations
Shallow marine deposits
Source rock formations
Mining in Colombia
Formations
Fossiliferous stratigraphic units of South America
Paleontology in Colombia
Formations
Formations
Formations
Formations
Muysccubun